Kurt Johansson (born 1960) is a Swedish mathematician, specializing in probability theory.

Johansson received his PhD in 1988 from Uppsala University under the supervision of Lennart Carleson and is a professor in mathematics at KTH Royal Institute of Technology.

In 2002 Johansson was an invited speaker of the International Congress of Mathematicians in Beijing and was awarded the Göran Gustafsson Prize. In 2006 he was elected a member of the Royal Swedish Academy of Sciences. In 2012 he was elected a fellow of the American Mathematical Society.

Selected publications

References

 

1960 births
Living people
Swedish mathematicians
Probability theorists
Uppsala University alumni
Academic staff of the KTH Royal Institute of Technology
Fellows of the American Mathematical Society
Members of the Royal Swedish Academy of Sciences
21st-century Swedish mathematicians